Procambarus rathbunae is a species of crayfish in family Cambaridae. It is endemic to Okaloosa County and Walton County, Florida, and is listed as Data Deficient on the IUCN Red List.

References

Cambaridae
Endemic fauna of Florida
Freshwater crustaceans of North America
Crustaceans described in 1940
Taxa named by Horton H. Hobbs Jr.
Taxonomy articles created by Polbot